Stare Juchy  is a village in Ełk County, Warmian-Masurian Voivodeship, in northern Poland. It is the seat of the gmina (administrative district) called Gmina Stare Juchy. 

The village has a population of 1,800.

References

Stare Juchy